In late 1995, a series of general strikes were organized in France, mostly in the public sector. The strikes received great popular support, despite paralyzing the country's transportation infrastructure, and other institutions. The strikes occurred in the context of a larger social movement against the reform agenda led by Prime Minister Alain Juppé, and they constituted the largest social movement in France since May 1968.

The November–December 1995 general strike has been seen as a turning point in the social movement.  Many organisations were created in the aftermath of these strikes.

Events
In May 1995, Jacques Chirac (RPR right-wing party) had been elected president. The new prime minister, Alain Juppé, then proposed an extensive program of welfare cutbacks, the Juppé Plan, which intended to reduce the budget deficit from 5% to 3% as required by the 1993 Maastricht Treaty. October and November saw a students' movement against the conservative agenda of the new government and its perceived attack on women's rights, notably the right to abortion and contraception. On 10 October and 24 November, a pay freeze on the public sector was met by civil servants' strikes supported by all major trade unions (CGT, CFDT, FO, etc.). The Juppé Plan was also a target of this strike.

In December, the railway workers were called out on strike against the Juppé Plan by their unions nationwide, and this paralyzed France's railway system. The main grievances for the railway workers were the loss of the right to retire at age 55 and an SNCF restructuring plan that was to eliminate thousands of jobs, and which was imposed on the workers by SNCF management without negotiation. The railway workers were joined by Paris's  metro personnel, postal workers, school teachers, and other public workers. The strikes spread from Paris, soon effectively covering the entire country. Major demonstrations were organized in both Paris and in the provinces.

The strike was called off on 15 December, when Juppé dropped the retirement reform plan.

Figures
The DARES statistical institute of the Ministry of Employment counted 6 million strike days (summing up each individual's decision to go on strike, per day) in 1995, against 1 million the previous year. Among these 6 million strike-days, 4 million were in the public sector (including France Télécom) and 2 million in the private and semi-public sector (including SNCF, RATP, Air France and Air Inter). In this last sector, the average number of strike-days from 1982 to 1994 had been of 1.1 million a year (while it was 3.3 million from 1971 to 1981).

Starting in November, the SNCF and the RATP were paralyzed for two months. Despite the inconveniences, public support remained firmly with the strikers. People started hitch-hiking and sharing cars to go to work, using bikes, etc.

See also
2010 strikes in France
November 2007 strikes in France
2006 labour protests in France
French Fifth Republic

References

External links
 French strike wave of December 1995 at flag.blackened.net

Strikes In France, 1995
Contemporary French history
Labor disputes in France
Rail transport strikes
Strikes in France
Strikes of 1995
November 1995 events in Europe
December 1995 events in Europe